Shen Zhuliang, Duke of Ye or Gao, Duke of Ye (c. 529 BCE – after 478 BCE), was a general and Prime Minister of the Kingdom of Chu during the Spring and Autumn period of ancient China.

Shen Zhuliang's father, Shen Yin Shu, was a great-grandson of King Zhuang of Chu and died in the historic Battle of Boju in 506 BCE.  After his father's death, King Zhao of Chu  enfeoffed Shen Zhuliang with the city of Ye (in present-day Ye County, Henan) at the northern frontier of the Chu kingdom.  He was known as Ye Gong (Duke of Ye), and became the founding ancestor of the Ye surname, which is today the 42nd most common surname in China.

In 489 BCE, Confucius visited Shen Zhuliang in Ye, and their conversations were recorded in the Analects of Confucius.

Shen Zhuliang became the Prime Minister and Chief Military Commander, the top two government posts of Chu.

He did not keep both posts for long.

Legend
In Liu Xiang's New Prefaces, there was a story saying that the Duke of Ye loved dragons so much that the walls of his house were decorated with dragons. The real dragons in the heaven heard that and decided to visit him. But when he saw them, he fled in terror instead. The idiom “” was derived from this story, meaning that someone is pretending to like something which one actually dislikes or fears.

References

Zhou dynasty generals
Zhou dynasty nobility
Chu state people
6th-century BC births
5th-century BC deaths
6th-century BC Chinese people
5th-century BC Chinese people
Lingyin of Chu